Aleksandr Georgievich Gerasimov (born 22 January 1975) is a retired volleyball player from Russia.

He was born in Ekaterinburg.

Gerasimov was a member of the men's national team that won the silver medal at the 2000 Summer Olympics in Sydney, Australia. He also won the 2002 Volleyball World League with Russia, and the 1999 World Cup.

References

External links
 
 
 

1975 births
Living people
Russian men's volleyball players
Volleyball players at the 2000 Summer Olympics
Olympic volleyball players of Russia
Olympic silver medalists for Russia
Sportspeople from Yekaterinburg
Olympic medalists in volleyball
Medalists at the 2000 Summer Olympics
20th-century Russian people
21st-century Russian people